Hutchinson Commons (also known as Hutchinson Hall) at the University of Chicago is modeled, nearly identically, on the hall of Christ Church, one of Oxford University's constituent colleges. The great room (or main dining room) measures 115 feet by 40 feet, and was for many years the principal site of convocations of the university. It is located in Chicago's Hyde Park community and is currently used as a dining hall and lounge for university students and professors. The building was donated to the University by the banker, philanthropist and university trustee and treasurer Charles L. Hutchinson through a donation of $60,000 (about $1.7 million in 2015) for the purpose.

Gallery

References

External links

Buildings and structures in Chicago
University of Chicago